Sam Ybarra (1945–1982) was a United States Army soldier who served in the Tiger Force commando unit attached to the 101st Airborne Division during the Vietnam War. He is notable for alleged involvement in war crimes alongside the Tiger Force unit.

Ybarra was born and raised on the San Carlos Apache Indian Reservation in Arizona to a Mexican father and an Apache mother. When he was five, his father died in a bar brawl, and after that he was raised by his mother. He attended Globe High School in Globe, Arizona, and was arrested four times as a teenager for disturbing the peace and underage drinking.

Ybarra enlisted in the U.S. Army in 1966, along with his childhood friend, Kenneth Green, and the friends were attached to the Tiger Force unit. Both he and Green committed atrocities against Vietnamese civilians during the war, and engaged in the Tiger Force practice of cutting off trophy ears from their victims.

Ybarra was noted by the Stars and Stripes magazine as having recorded the 1000th kill of Operation Wheeler.

Green was killed on September 29, 1967, and other Tiger Force soldiers claim that it threw Ybarra over the edge, as he vowed to avenge his friend's death. As a result, he became the unit's worst killer, and had to be transferred out of the unit to an artillery company in early 1968. Ybarra went on to be court martialed for insubordination, and was dishonorably discharged in late 1968. He would later be named in 7 of the 30 allegations that the Army would later investigate the unit for.

Once discharged, Ybarra could not be compelled to testify to the investigations against him, and declined three times. He died of pneumonia in 1982, at age 37, living with his mother on the San Carlos Apache Reservation in Arizona, reportedly contrite and depressed over his role in the war.

References

 Sallah, Michael and Mitch Weiss. Tiger Force: A True Story of Men and War. New York: Little, Brown and Company, 2006, 
 Greiner, Bernd. Krieg ohne Fronten: Die USA in Vietnam. Hamburg: Hamburger Edition, 2007. , 
 Toledo Blade Article Series on Tiger Force 

1945 births
1982 deaths
Apache people
United States Army soldiers
United States Army personnel of the Vietnam War
American people of Mexican descent
Native American United States military personnel
Deaths from pneumonia in Arizona
War criminals